Psilocorsis cryptolechiella (black-fringed leaftier moth, black-fringed psilocorsis moth or beech leaftier) is a moth of the family Depressariidae. It is found in the United States, including Alabama, Illinois, Massachusetts, Pennsylvania and South Carolina.

The wingspan is about 16 mm.

The larvae feed on Fagus species, including Fagus grandifolia. Larvae create a leaf shelter.

References

Moths described in 1872
Psilocorsis